Amirthi Zoological Park is a zoo in Vellore district in the Indian state of Tamil Nadu. The area of the park is 25 hectares and one can find beautiful water falls.

Half of this jungle is cleared to serve as a tourist spot while the other half is developed as a wildlife sanctuary. A trek for a kilometer leads one to a full view of seasonal waterfall. The inflow of tourists is more only during the holidays. Animals at the park include spotted deer, mongoose, hedgehog, foxes, reason monkeys, red headed parrots, love birds, tortoises, peacock, crocodiles, wild cats, eagles, ducks, pigeons, wild parrots, rabbits, and pythons(Indian Rock Python).

Amirthi is the biggest forest in Tamil Nadu Located in the Vellore district of Tamil Nadu, Amirthi Forest is rich is a variety of fauna and flora. One half of this 25 km forest is made as a Wildlife Sanctuary and the other half serves as a tourist spot.

Development and expansion
On 13 September 2013, Tamil Nadu government announced that it has allocated 3.5 crore rupees for the development of Amirthi zoo. This development will include providing amenities such as resting places, drinking water facility, food joints, pathways connecting waterfalls, information centers and watch towers.
 Tamil Nadu Forest Department has planned to upgrade the mini zoo in Amirthi into a small zoo at a total cost of 19 crore rupees. Vellore district collector also informed that Central Zoo Authority (CZA) has approved the upgradation of Amirthi mini zoo.
 Elephant camps: Amirthi forest in Vellore Forest division will be one of the probable sites in future hosting rejuvenation camps for temple elephants in the state.

See also

Tourism in Vellore

References

External links

Zoos in Tamil Nadu
Tourist attractions in Vellore
Protected areas of Tamil Nadu
1967 establishments in Madras State
Zoos established in 1967